Two Destinies (Spanish:Dos destinos) is a 1936 Uruguayan drama film directed by Juan Etchebehere.

Cast
 Pepita Ceppi as Lilia Alicia Campo  
 Pepe Corbi as Pablo Torres  
 Luis Farina as Adolfo Torres  
 Carlos Garbarino as Esteban 
 Tina Lova as Betty  
 Ángel D. Rodríguez as General Campo

References

Bibliography 
 Rist, Peter H. Historical Dictionary of South American Cinema. Rowman & Littlefield, 2014.

External links 
 

1936 films
1936 drama films
Uruguayan drama films
1930s Spanish-language films
Uruguayan black-and-white films